The Sucre spiny-rat (Proechimys urichi) is a species of rodent in the family Echimyidae. It is endemic to Venezuela.

Phylogeny
Morphological characters and mitochondrial cytochrome b DNA sequences showed that P. urichi belongs to the so-called trinitatus group of Proechimys species, and shares closer phylogenetic affinities with the other members of this clade: P. trinitatus, P. mincae, P. guairae, P. poliopus, P. magdalenae, P. chrysaeolus, and P. hoplomyoides.

References

Mammals of Venezuela
Endemic fauna of Venezuela
Proechimys
Mammals described in 1899
Taxa named by Joel Asaph Allen
Taxonomy articles created by Polbot
Taxobox binomials not recognized by IUCN